Giorgio Consolini (28 August 1920, Bologna – 28 April 2012, Bologna) was an Italian singer. In 1954, he won the Sanremo Music Festival in partnership with Gino Latilla, with the song "Tutte le mamme".

Biographical notes 
On 5 October 2008, Consolini participated in Omaggio a Pino Rucher, una vita per la chitarra ("Homage to Pino Rucher, a life for the guitar"). The event, in honor of Pino Rucher (RAI guitarist) twelve years after his death, was sponsored by the municipal authorities of Manfredonia and by the authorities of the Province of Foggia.

References

Further reading 
 
 

Italian pop singers
Italian folk singers
1920 births
2012 deaths
Musicians from Bologna
Sanremo Music Festival winners
20th-century Italian male singers